Don't Give Up on Me is a studio album by American R&B/Soul singer Solomon Burke, recorded and released in 2002 on Fat Possum Records. The album won the Grammy Award for Best Contemporary Blues Album. It is noteworthy for the contributions of original and previously unreleased compositions by top-rank songwriters, the effect of which placed Burke back in the public eye for a time. Guest stars are Daniel Lanois, who plays electric guitar on "Stepchild", and The Blind Boys of Alabama, who feature on backing vocals for "None of Us Are Free". "None of Us Are Free" was also featured at the end of the sixth episode ("Spin") of the second season of House. "Fast Train" was featured during the ending montage of the season three finale of The Wire.

The title track, written by the team of Dan Penn and Carson Whitsett with Hoy Lindsey, gained popularity (and introduced Burke to a new generation) when it was used several times on the popular primetime teen soap opera The O.C. as one of the signature song of adult couple Sandy and Kirsten Cohen, played by Peter Gallagher and Kelly Rowan. It became a staple of Burke's live performances and has been covered by Joe Cocker, as well as Peter Gallagher, who also performed the song on The O.C.

Track listing
 "Don't Give Up on Me" (Dan Penn, Carson Whitsett, Hoy Lindsey) – 3:45
 "Fast Train" (Van Morrison) – 5:43
 "Diamond in Your Mind" (Tom Waits, Kathleen Brennan) – 4:24
 "Flesh and Blood" (Joe Henry) – 6:07
 "Soul Searchin'" (Brian Wilson, Andy Paley) – 3:59
 "Only a Dream" (Van Morrison) – 5:09
 "The Judgment" (Elvis Costello, Cait O'Riordan) – 3:30
 "Stepchild" (Bob Dylan) – 5:10
 "The Other Side of the Coin" (Nick Lowe) – 3:46
 "None of Us Are Free" (Barry Mann, Cynthia Weil, Brenda Russell) – 5:29
 "Sit This One Out" (Pick Purnell) – 4:33

Personnel
Solomon Burke – vocals, piano, electric guitar
Chris Bruce – electric guitar
David Palmer – piano, keyboard
David Piltch – bass guitar
Jay Bellerose – drums, percussion
Bennie Wallace – tenor saxophone
Niki Harris – backing vocals
Jean McClain – backing vocals
Rudy Copeland – Hammond organ 
Daniel Lanois – electric guitar
Clarence Fountain – backing vocals
Jimmy Carter – backing vocals
Bishop Billy Bowers – backing vocals
Ben Moore – backing vocals
Eric McKinnie – backing vocals
Caleb Butler – backing vocals
Joey Williams – backing vocals
Tracy Pierce – backing vocals

References

2002 albums
Solomon Burke albums
Albums produced by Joe Henry
Grammy Award for Best Contemporary Blues Album
Fat Possum Records albums
Anti- (record label) albums